Elberon is an unincorporated community in Surry County, Virginia, United States. Elberon had a post office, which opened on December 24, 1902, and closed on January 23, 2010; it still has its own ZIP code, 23846.

References

Unincorporated communities in Surry County, Virginia
Unincorporated communities in Virginia